Chaos: An Interdisciplinary Journal of Nonlinear Science is a monthly peer-reviewed scientific journal covering nonlinear systems and describing their manifestations in a manner comprehensible to researchers from a broad spectrum of disciplines. The editor-in-chief is Jürgen Kurths of the Potsdam Institute for Climate Impact Research.

Abstracting and indexing 
The journal is abstracted and indexed in the Science Citation Index and Current Contents/Physical Chemical and Earth Sciences. According to the Journal Citation Reports, the journal has a 2020 impact factor of 3.267.

References

External links 
 

American Institute of Physics academic journals
Quarterly journals
Publications established in 1991
English-language journals
Physics journals